Slavcho Batinkov is a former Olympic cross-country skier for the Bulgarian Olympic team.  He competed for Bulgaria in cross-country skiing in every Winter Olympics from 1992 through 2002, though he never finished higher than 13th place in any event.

References

Place of birth missing (living people)
Year of birth missing (living people)
Living people
Olympic cross-country skiers of Bulgaria
Cross-country skiers at the 1992 Winter Olympics
Cross-country skiers at the 1994 Winter Olympics
Cross-country skiers at the 1998 Winter Olympics
Cross-country skiers at the 2002 Winter Olympics
Sportspeople from Beaverton, Oregon
Bulgarian male cross-country skiers